Bojohagur or Bojohaghur Duanasir is a summit in the Batura Muztagh, a subrange of the Karakoram range in Pakistan. It is the west summit of a short ridge whose high point is Ultar Sar, also known as Bojohaghur Duanasir II (despite being higher). It was first climbed in 1984 by E. Kisa, M. Nagoshi, and R. Okamoto, members of a Japanese expedition led by Tsumeo Omae, which ascended from the Hasanabad Glacier via the Southwest Ridge

Location

Nearby summits and glaciers
To the northwest of the Bojohaghur/Ultar massif is the huge pyramid of Shispare (7,611 m/24,970 ft). Along the southwest ridge of the massif are Hunza Peak and the striking rock spire of Bublimotin (Ladyfinger Peak).
The glaciers draining the slopes of the massif are (clockwise from north): the Ghulkin Glacier, the Gulmit Glacier, the Ahmad Abad Glacier, the Ultar Glacier, and the Hasanabad Glacier. (Many of these have other names as well.)

See also
 Highest Mountains of the World

Notes
  These are the coordinates of the Ultar peak.

References

Sources
　Ultar Sar
　Hiroshima　Alpine　Club　expedition

Mountains of Gilgit-Baltistan
Seven-thousanders of the Karakoram